Jefferson Wiltse Rewey (May 26, 1835 – December 23, 1905) was a member of the Wisconsin State Assembly.

Biography
Rewey was born on May 26, 1835 in Berkshire, New York. On February 16, 1859, he married Eliza A. Galbraith. They had two children. Rewey, Wisconsin is named after him. He once owned a farm in the location of what is now Rewey. He died in Mineral Point, Wisconsin in 1905.

Political career
Rewey was a member of the Assembly during the 1868, 1881, and 1882 sessions. Additionally, he was Town Clerk and Chairman of the Town Board of Supervisors (similar to city council) of Mifflin, Wisconsin and County Commissioner (similar to Supervisor) and Chairman of the County Board of Iowa County, Wisconsin. He was a Republican.

References

External links
 

People from Tioga County, New York
People from Iowa County, Wisconsin
Republican Party members of the Wisconsin State Assembly
Wisconsin city council members
County supervisors in Wisconsin
City and town clerks
Farmers from Wisconsin
1835 births
1905 deaths
19th-century American politicians